Amusia is the first album by American punk rock band Katastrophy Wife, released in 2001 in the UK and 2002 in the US.

Track listing

Personnel
Kat Bjellandvocals, guitar
Keith St. Louisbass
Glen Mattsondrums

References

External links

[]

2001 debut albums
Katastrophy Wife albums